Bernardo Tanucci (20 February 1698 – 29 April 1783) was an Italian statesman, who brought an enlightened absolutism style of government to the Kingdom of the Two Sicilies for Charles III and his son Ferdinand IV.

Biography
Born of a poor family in Stia, near Arezzo (Tuscany), Tanucci was educated, thanks to a patron, at the University of Pisa. Tanucci was appointed a professor of law there in 1725 and attracted attention by his defence of the authenticity of the Codex Pisanus of the Pandects of Justinian. When Charles, Duke of Parma, son of Philip V of Spain, who succeeded him as monarch and became Charles III, passed through Tuscany on his way to conquer the Kingdom of Naples, Cosimo III de' Medici, Grand Duke of Tuscany, encouraged him to take Tanucci with him. In Naples Charles appointed him at first councillor of state, then superintendent of posts, minister of justice in 1752, foreign minister in 1754 and finally prime minister and a marquis.

As prime minister Tanucci was most zealous regalist in establishing the supremacy of a modernized State over the Catholic Church, and in abolishing the feudal privileges of Papacy and the nobility in the Kingdom of the Two Sicilies. Governing under the principles of enlightened absolutism, he restricted the jurisdiction of the bishops, eliminated medieval privilege, and closed convents and monasteries and reduced the taxes to be forwarded to the pontifical Curia. These reforms were sanctioned in a Concordat signed with the Papacy in 1741, the application of which, however, went far beyond the intentions of the Holy See.

For the reform of the laws Tanucci instituted a commission of learned jurists with instructions to create a new legal code, the Codice Caroline, which was, however, not put into force. When Charles of Naples became Charles III of Spain in 1759, Tanucci was made president of the council of regency instituted for the nine-year-old Ferdinand IV, who even when he reached his majority preferred to leave the government in Tanucci's hands, constantly overseen from Spain by Charles III.

In foreign affairs, Tanucci kept Naples out of wars and entanglements, though in 1742 an English fleet off the coast helped ensure Neapolitan neutrality in the war between Spain and Austria. Following the discovery of the Herculaneum papyri in 1752, per the advise from Bernardo, King Charles VII of Naples established a commission to study them.

Tanucci worked at establishing for Bourbon Naples the kind of controls over the church that were effected by the Gallican church in Bourbon France:  revenues of vacant bishoprics and abbeys went to the crown, superfluous convents were suppressed, tithes abolished and the acquisition of new Church property by mortmain was forbidden. Royal assent was required for the publication in Naples of papal bulls and concessions were no longer considered eternal. The status of Naples as a papal fief, dating from the time of the Hohenstaufen, was denied: the king of Naples served at the pleasure of God only. Appeals to Rome were forbidden without the royal permission. Marriage was declared a civil contract. And by the order of Charles III the Jesuits were suppressed and expelled from the Kingdom of Naples in 1767, a move in which Tanucci was in general sympathy with other ministers at the Bourbon courts, as Aranda in Spain, Choiseul in France, du Tillot in Parma, and also with Pombal in Portugal.

Pope Clement XIII responded with excommunication, whereupon Tanucci occupied the monasteries at Benevento and Pontecorvo, which were not returned to the Roman Church until after the pope's general order of dissolution of the Society of Jesus in 1773. The protests of the bishops against many of the new teachings in the schools after the expulsion of the Jesuits were dismissed as invalid. His policy in finance and in regard to the food taxes provoked popular revolutions on several occasions.

When, in 1774, Maria Carolina of Austria, the Habsburg queen of Ferdinand IV, joined the Council of State, the power of Tanucci began to decline. In vain he endeavored to neutralize the queen's influence, but in 1777 he was dismissed and retired.

He died in Naples in 1783.

Notes

External links

Catholic Encyclopedia: Tanucci; a very severe review

1698 births
1783 deaths
People from the Province of Arezzo
18th-century Italian politicians
Bernardo